Phoebe luteola is a species of beetle in the family Cerambycidae. It was described by Henry Walter Bates in 1881. It is known from Guatemala.

References

Hemilophini
Beetles described in 1881